Erwin Zelazny (born 22 September 1991) is a French professional footballer who plays as a goalkeeper for Championnat National 2 club Beauvais.

Career
On 21 May 2021, he joined fourth-tier club Beauvais.

Personal life 
Born in France, Zelazny is of Polish descent.

References

1991 births
People from Grande-Synthe
Sportspeople from Nord (French department)
French people of Polish descent
Living people
French footballers
Association football goalkeepers
FC Nantes players
Rodez AF players
ES Troyes AC players
Stade Malherbe Caen players
AS Beauvais Oise players
Ligue 1 players
Ligue 2 players
Championnat National 2 players
Championnat National 3 players
Footballers from Hauts-de-France